Dissent is an EP by American deathgrind band Misery Index.

Track listing
All music and lyrics written by Misery Index, unless noted otherwise.
 "Sheep and Wolves"
 "Exception to the Ruled"
 "The Imperial Ambition"
 "Multiply by Fire"
 "Defector"
 "Screaming at a Wall" (Minor Threat cover) (Vinyl-only bonus track)

Personnel

Production
 Eyal Levi – recording

References

2004 albums
Misery Index (band) albums